Joseph Michael DeLamielleure  (born March 16, 1951) is an American former professional football player who was a guard in the National Football League (NFL). He was an All-American playing college football for the Michigan State Spartans. He was selected by the Buffalo Bills in the first round of the 1973 NFL Draft. He won All-Rookie Honors, after finding out a physical condition with his irregular heartbeat was not serious. In 1973 the Buffalo Bills rushing offense led the NFL in yards, yards per carry, as well as rushing touchdowns. He is also one of the first living NFL players to be tested and diagnosed with CTE (Chronic Traumatic Encephalopathy).

Playing career
DeLamielleure was perhaps the central figure in the "Electric Company," the Bills' offensive line that paved the way for O. J. Simpson to rush for 2,003 yards in 1973, the first player ever to break that barrier, and the only player ever to do so in a 14-game schedule.

The league-leading rushing yardage mark of 3,088 yards is still the 14-game record. Only the 1978 New England Patriots have bettered that mark and did it in 16 games. Individually, Simpson led the NFL in all four major rushing categories. Joe also had the longest run in the NFL. The 2,003 yards Simpson rushed for is still the 14 game record (Eric Dickerson, Barry Sanders, Terrell Davis, Jamal Lewis, Chris Johnson, Adrian Peterson and Derrick Henry achieved their marks in 16 games). DeLamielleure was also on the kickoff return team that blocked for Wallace Francis, who led NFL with two return touchdowns. DeLamielleure played on the wedge of the kickoff return team his entire career in Buffalo.

The following year, 1974, the Bills improved to 9–5 and made the playoffs. DeLamielleure was voted second-team All-Pro. In 1975 the Bills displayed one of the most potent offenses of the decade. They led the NFL in eleven categories, including total offense, rushing, rushing average, points, touchdowns and touchdown passes en route to an 8–6 record.  The offensive line also allowed the fewest sacks in AFC. Simpson, behind the "Electric Company" achieved his second "quadruple crown" in three years and also had the longest run in NFL. Individually, DeLamielleure was named First-team All-Pro.

1976: Simpson again lead the NFL in rushing and DeLamielleure is named a First-team All-Pro.
1977: With Simpson injured at mid-season, the Bills pass more often, leading the NFL in passing yards and total passing attempts.
1978: With Simpson traded, Bills running back Terry Miller takes over and is 9th in the NFL in rushing.

DeLamielleure was named an All-Pro six times and was named to the Pro Bowl six times. In 1975, DeLamielleure was named by the NFLPA as Offensive Lineman of the Year. In 1973, DeLamielleure was Co-Offensive Linemen of the Year as awarded by the 1000 Yard Rusher Club, Columbus, Ohio. In 1977, DeLamielleure received the Forrest Gregg Award as the NFL's Top Offensive Lineman for that season.

In 1980, DeLamielleure was traded to the Cleveland Browns where he blocked for his 2nd NFL MVP, Brian Sipe. DeLamielleure became the first player ever to block for a 2,000-yard rusher and a 4,000-yard passer.  Of those who have done it since, (Jackie Slater, Doug Smith, Irv Pankey, Kevin Glover, and Tom Nalen) only DeLamielleure's duo were NFL MVPs and the passer (Sipe) also won the NFL passing crown. Also, the 1980 Browns offensive line led NFL in allowing the lowest sacks percentage and blocked for a 1,000-yard runner (Mike Pruitt). During his five years with Cleveland, he played every game. In 1979, DeLamielleure was named to the NFL's All-Decade Team. He played his final year in the NFL, 1985, back with the Buffalo Bills.

In 1992, DeLamielleure had a short stint with the Charlotte Rage of the Arena Football League.

DeLamielleure was named to the Pro Football Hall of Fame in 2003 and was inducted to the East-West Shrine Game Hall of Fame in 2007.

DeLamielleure had an argument with Gene Upshaw, the head of the Players Union, about retired NFL player's pensions up until Upshaw's death in August 2008.

DeLamielleure was a promoter of the All-American Football League, a spring league that hoped to fill a void of the now-defunct NFL Europe. The AAFL planned to take collegiate players provided they've earned a four-year college degree. However, the league did not play a game.

In 2009, DeLamielleure and his two former college teammates at Michigan State University embarked on a bicycle ride from East Lansing, Michigan to the site of "The City of the Children" orphanage in Mexico. The bike tour was to raise funds needed to complete construction and provide the necessary resources to support the abandoned, abused and neglected children of that region.

Coaching career
DeLamielleure served as Offensive Line Coach under Sam Rutigliano for two seasons at Liberty University and eventually coached at Duke University in the same role from 1996-2000. He later coached in the Charlotte area with the Private Coaching Service CoachUp.

Notes 
In 1969, DeLamielleure graduated from St. Clement High School in Center Line, MI.  Joe is the only NFL football player ever from that school.
In 1975, DeLamielleure was the NFLPA AFC Arm Wrestling Champion (he lost the final to Ed White).
In 1978, DeLamielleure was the NFLPA NFL Racquetball Champion.
In 1979, DeLamielleure was NFLPA AFC Racquetball champion (he lost the final to the NFC competitor Rafael Septién who was 5'9" and 160 pounds).
In 1982, DeLamielleure competed in the NFL's Strongest Man Competition. The other contestants were Lyle Alzado, John Matuszak, Mike Webster, Steve Furness, Curt Marsh, and Bob Young. Only Marsh and DeLamielleure are still living and Marsh has had a leg amputated.
In 2004, DeLamielleure was inducted into the Michigan Sports Hall of Fame.

References

1951 births
Living people
American football offensive linemen
Buffalo Bills players
Cleveland Browns players
American Conference Pro Bowl players
Michigan State Spartans football players
Pro Football Hall of Fame inductees
Charlotte Rage players
Players of American football from Detroit